Angeliki-Melina Emmanouilidou (born September 18, 1994 in Korinthos, Greece) is a female professional volleyball player from Greece, who is a member of the Greece women's national volleyball team. At club level, she plays in Hellenic Volley League for Greek powerhouse Olympiacos Piraeus.

Sporting achievements

European Honours
CEV Women's Challenge Cup
  Runner-up: 2017 with Olympiacos S.F. Piraeus

National championships
 2015/2016  Hellenic Championship, with Olympiacos S.F. Piraeus
 2016/2017  Hellenic Championship, with Olympiacos S.F. Piraeus

National cups
 2015/2016  Hellenic Cup, with Olympiacos S.F. Piraeus
 2016/2017  Hellenic Cup, with Olympiacos S.F. Piraeus

References

External links
 profile at CEV web site cev.eu
 profile - clubs - titles at volleybox.net
 profile at greekvolley.gr 
 Olympiacos Women's Volleyball team roster at CEV web site
 Emmanouilidou in A.O. Thira sport24.gr (in Greek)

1994 births
Living people
Olympiacos Women's Volleyball players
Greek women's volleyball players
Sportspeople from Corinth
21st-century Greek women